Gallia–Meigs Regional Airport  is an airport located in Gallipolis, Ohio, United States.

The airport is named after Gallia County and Meigs County.

External links 

Airports in Ohio